Masein may refer to:

Masein, Switzerland
Masein, Homalin, Burma
Masein, Kalewa, Burma